Anti-Barney humor is a form of humor that targets the main character Barney the Dinosaur from the children's television series Barney & Friends and singles out the show for criticism.

In University of Chicago professor W. J. T. Mitchell's book The Last Dinosaur Book: The Life and Times of a Cultural Icon, he notes that the program is often a target for parody and negative attacks by non- preschool aged children, adolescents, and adults in the United States and elsewhere; the notion given that the show is "saccharine", "boring", "annoying", "sugary", "dangerous" or "uneducational". For comparison, other popular preschool children's characters such as Thomas the Tank Engine, Caillou, Dora the Explorer, Bert and Ernie, Elmo, Cookie Monster, Big Bird, Bali, Arthur, Peppa Pig, and the Teletubbies have been subject to subversive adult humor; in Barney's case, however, the humor has typically been far more dark and in a more vicious and hostile nature toward Barney.

History
Barney & Friends first aired in 1992, gaining popularity among viewers under the age of four, but also garnering disapproval by most older children and young adults, who criticized it for being "saccharine", "sunshine-and-flowers", and "one-dimensional". University of Chicago professor W. J. T. Mitchell noted that: 

These children were among the first to practice anti-Barney humor, and were given an entire chapter of the 1995 book Greasy Grimy Gopher Guts: The Subversive Folklore of Childhood.

Eventually, adults began to contribute to the anti-Barney humor, including some parents and celebrities. Many families now refuse to watch the show because of its supposed "one-dimensionality" and "lack of educational value", and several YouTube videos have plush dolls of the character being destroyed in various ways, including being burnt, destroyed by small explosions, being shot by many weapons using tannerite or being run over by vehicles.

Sources of hostility include episodes where Barney and the other characters do potentially harmful acts such as lying, cheating, stealing (with no punishment or scolding from the purple dinosaur), and catching stinging insects.  Other reasons cited for the hostility also include the purple dinosaur's voice (described by many parents as "dopey"), lack of varied facial expressions other than a toothy smile, and personality (described as being "self-centered"), as well as how the children in the series interact with the dinosaur characters.

In Barney vs. The San Diego Chicken, Ted Giannoulas stated {{blockquote|[...] "Perhaps the most insightful criticism regarding Barney is that his shows do not assist children in learning to deal with negative feelings and emotions. As one commentator puts it, the real danger from Barney is denial: the refusal to recognize the existence of unpleasant realities. For along with his steady diet of giggles and unconditional love, Barney offers our children a one-dimensional world where everyone must be happy and everything must be resolved right away."}}

Additionally, the show was ranked number 50 on TV Guides List of the 50 Worst TV Shows of All Time, the only public television series to make the list.

Examples

Barkley vs. Barney
Charles Barkley was the guest host of Saturday Night Live on September 25, 1993, and performed a skit that parodied his Godzilla-themed Nike commercial by facing off against Barney in a one-on-one matchup.

The Barney Fun Page

The Barney Fun Page is an early website that allows users to attack a crude drawing of Barney with icons representing a knife, gun, and other weapons. Hosted originally on a University of Alberta computer system, the website was created in 1994. It is among the oldest websites in the world still operating as of 2022.

"Baloney and Kids"
The animated series Animaniacs produced a satirical episode in which the Warner siblings confront "Baloney", an orange dinosaur meant to be a parody of Barney. The entire episode is dedicated to lampooning the series, as well as PBS for airing it (the introduction promotes the show as part of the "SBS (Stupid Broadcasting Service)" while the voice-over says, "Baloney and Kids is brought to you by this station and other stations that lack clever programming."). The Warners try various methods to get rid of Baloney (including dropping anvils on his head; after the second time Baloney says, "Let's do that again!"), but only escape when the show runs out of time, at which point they also take with them three extremely desperate adult members of the regular crew (including Hello Nurse).

"Georgie Must Die"
The sitcom Dinosaurs similarly produced a satirical episode, featuring "Georgie", another Barney parody that is an orange hippo, who is idolized by Baby Sinclair, much to the irritation of his siblings and his father, Earl Sinclair. In the episode, Baby Sinclair is enjoying watching a videotape featuring Georgie singing his song, "I Hug You" (a thinly veiled parody of Barney's famous "I Love You, You Love Me" song). Before long, the singing enrages Earl until he finally removes the tape and breaks it into pieces, prompting a tantrum from Baby. To make up for this, Earl has to take Baby to Georgie, who is making a live appearance at the nearby mall. However, Earl refuses to do so upon seeing the long line of Georgie's fans, prompting another tantrum from Baby. Desperate to cheer up Baby, Earl dons a costume and imitates Georgie to stop Baby's cries. Unfortunately, this gets Earl arrested for copyright infringement by Georgie's people and is thrown in jail. While in jail, Earl is visited by Georgie himself, who reveals his intentions to assert his brand on the children and profit from the marketing and merchandising.

Earl escapes with the help of Jean-Claude and Brigitte, members of the Parents' Resistance who see Georgie for what he truly is: a money-grabbing, tax-evading fraud. With help from his friend and co-worker, Roy Hess, Earl sneaks into Georgie's studio, knocks Georgie out,  and goes on TV disguised as Georgie in an attempt to reveal the hippo's intentions. However, before long, the real Georgie comes on stage, and an on-screen brawl ensues between him and Earl. During the fight, Roy finds himself standing before the camera and begins entertaining the studio audience by singing "Brick House". The fight culminates with Earl pinning Georgie against a wall, and just as the former readies to punch out the latter, the latter says "You wouldn't punch out the most beloved character on children's TV..."  Earl then looks to the camera and says, "This is for all you parents at home!" before delivering a final blow to the hippo. At the end of the episode, it is reported that Georgie had been arrested for racketeering and tax evasion.

Music and related video
One of the first well known anti-Barney songs was Tony Mason's "Barney's on Fire" (often miscredited to "Weird Al" Yankovic, who denied writing the song).  Although Yankovic did not write "Barney's on Fire", he did mention Barney in the lyrics of the parody song "Jurassic Park" ("...I'm afraid those things'll harm me / 'Cause they sure don't act like Barney..."). The music video for "Jurassic Park" also includes Barney's head being bitten off by a Tyrannosaurus, who later coughs up the head after receiving the Heimlich maneuver from a Brontosaurus. Comedian Stephen Lynch has gained fame from his "Evil Barney Bus Driver" and "Evil Barney Babysitter" audio skits (among others), which he did for Opie and Anthony in 1997 and which have been commonly posted on the Internet.

An online video created by Ryan Steinhardt in 1998 combines clips from Barney and Friends with the 2Pac single "Hit 'Em Up", designed to give the viewer the impression that Barney and the other characters from the show are rapping. The humor is based on the juxtaposition of the actual song's heavy use of profanity and violent content, as opposed to the regular lessons and content on Barney and Friends.

The animated TV series Garfield and Friends parodied Barney in the episode "The Beast from Beyond".

Print media
A small Italian comic book imprint, Parody Press (an imprint of Eternity Comics), released an anthology comic book entitled Kill Barny [sic] in 1994, a collection of short stories and one-page strips depicting the death of the purple dinosaur. Several months later, another issue was released under the name Kill Barny Again!, reprinting most of Kill Barny but with some new material pages and a new cover.

The Mad magazine fold-in for issue #328 asked, "What Single Goal Has Brought Agreement And Unity Among Vastly Different Groups?" and the image, which featured pairs of opposite people proclaiming their support for the answer, folded into a dead Barney with the word "extinct" on it, and the caption then read "Death to Barney".

A 1994 FoxTrot comic strip features 10-year-old Jason writing a letter to PBS telling them that Barney should be eating the kids after he saw Jurassic Park, to which his friend Marcus says he would watch the show if that happened.

In May 1994, Michael Viner published a book called Final Exit For Barney. It consists of different ways to kill the character, mostly with crude humor. The book received mixed reviews.

The science humor magazine Annals of Improbable Research published, in its 1995 January and February issue, a taxonomical article entitled The Taxonomy of Barney that included X-rays of the character's skeleton.

Film
The closing scene of the 1998 film Mafia! depicts an assassin, Nick "The Eskimo" Molinaro, fatally stabbing a purple Barney-like dinosaur (who is seen eagerly watching pornography in his apartment) with a harpoon. The closing credits note that a shrine was built in Molinaro's honor, visited by millions of grateful parents for doing "the one deed to benefit all mankind."

The 2002 film Death to Smoochy loosely parodies anti-Barney humor. The film features disgraced former children's star "Rainbow Randolph" (portrayed by Robin Williams) as he tries to sabotage the Barney-like character that replaced him, a purple rhinoceros named Smoochy (portrayed by Edward Norton), and later the efforts of the Irish Mob to kill Smoochy. At one point, Smoochy's resemblance to Barney is acknowledged when Randolph refers to him as "Bastard son of Barney" in the film's final act.

Internet fiction
Several works of short fiction have revolved around not only killing Barney but portraying him as a demonic force to be defeated in an epic tale of good versus evil, including a series of short stories written by Brian Bull, such as the Day of The Barney trilogy about two children who fight the purple dinosaur and free hordes of children from his demonic control, and Batman versus Barney.

Another YouTube video shows Elmo singing his "Elmo's World" song while Barney the Dinosaur sings his "I Love You" song. As a result of Elmo's hate for Barney's singing, he shoots him with a shotgun or pistol and afterwards swears at the dead Barney. Retrieved on February 6, 2015. Note that these videos are meant to be here for proof of YouTube videos.

One rumor proposed that Barney was based on a 1930s serial killer. The rumor was confirmed as false by Snopes. Another false rumor claimed that the Purple dinosaur children's host Barney had cocaine hidden in his tail and would frequently use profanity with the child actors on the show.

JihadThe Jihad to Destroy Barney is a fictional jihad that sees itself in the ultimate battle against Barney (spelled B'harne therein) and his followers. It is described as "a heterogeneous organization of people on the Internet dedicated to defamation, humiliation, eradication, killing, and removal of Barney the Purple Dinosaur of the television show Barney & Friends from the airwaves and from every human's life." B'harne is depicted as a purple, scaly lizard-like demon with sharp talons, long teeth and glowing evil red eyes.

References to a Barney "Jihad" were found on Barney-related Usenet newsgroups as early as 1993. The website itself was active as of 1995. Furthermore, Douglass Streusand, a professor of Islamic history at Marine Corps Staff College in Virginia, discovered that the first entry of an Internet search on the term "jihad" referred to Barney.

"Barney = 666" joke
One of the most widely distributed works of anti-Barney humor appeared in the 2001 book Science Askew, which determined that a phrase describing Barney contained a chronogram of the Book of Revelation's Number of the Beast, 666.
Below is the formula of the equation:
 The character of Barney is well-described as a "cute purple dinosaur".
 The book points out how the former Latin alphabet used the letter V in place of U.
 Therefore the above phrase is modified to "cvte pvrple dinosavr".
 Letters that do not represent Roman numerals are removed, leaving: "c v v l d i v"
 When the remaining numbers 100, 5, 5, 50, 500, 1, and 5 are added, the result is 666, the Number of the Beast.
 This also works with "lovable purple dinosaur".  This gives the letters "l v l v l d i v", which in turn gives 50, 5, 50, 5, 50, 500, 1, and 5, which also adds up to 666.

Computer games
 The game Wolfenstein 3D by id Software was modded to replace boss characters with Barney. Because these changes were destructive (the original source code had to be replaced for the mod to take effect), the developers separated media data from the main program when developing Doom. These were known as WADs, for "Where's All the Data". They were modded to feature Barney as one of the enemy targets.
A computer game was released for Macintosh entitled Barney Carnage. One of the bosses in Monster Madness: Battle for Suburbia is a monstrous Barney parody named Mr. Huggles, who attacks by singing and attempting to hug unwilling pedestrians. After fighting him, his suit comes off, revealing a more vicious Jabba the Hutt-like being.
In the fighting game M.U.G.E.N, several fan-made characters of Barney exist, and are made to be deliberately weak so players can watch other characters, such as Godzilla, fight and defeat him effortlessly.
 John Dondzila wrote a homebrew game for the ColecoVision in 1996 which involved killing Barney. Called Purple Dinosaur Massacre, it was originally written for gaining sprite programming experience on the ColecoVision, but was released to the web via ClassicGaming.com in 1997 and gained some popularity among the readers of the website.
 The Animaniacs spoof, Baloney, was featured in the PC game Animaniacs Game Pack, which featured a game called "Baloney's Balloon Bop", a Breakout-style game in which Yakko bounces from a trampoline held by Wakko and Dot, popping rows of balloons above.  The player must move the latter two Warners to catch Yakko as he descends to prevent him from being caught by Baloney, who moves from side to side below.  Some balloons carry anvils that, once popped, drop and crush Baloney if he is beneath them, temporarily stunning him.  Some balloons contain power-ups that, among other things, can turn Yakko into a fireball which would reduce Baloney to ashes when touched.
Killing Barney was a common premise for fan-made ZZT games.

Legal issues
Lyons Partnership, owners of the intellectual property rights to Barney & Friends, claimed that some Barney spoofs that employed photos of the character or parody sound files represented trademark and copyright infringement. Lyons' lawyers subsequently demanded that such material be removed from the Internet. Some site owners complied after such threats, but American law establishes parody as a fair use defense against such infringement claims.

Barney vs. The San Diego Chicken
In 1994, comedy sketches of The San Diego Chicken during professional sporting events began to include scenes of the Chicken beating up a dinosaur character. Lyons Partnership began sending letters to Ted Giannoulas, who portrays the Chicken, demanding that he stop the alleged violation of Lyons' rights on the Barney character.

These threats did not stop the mock battles between the Chicken and Barney. On October 8, 1997, Lyons filed a lawsuit in Fort Worth, Texas federal district court against Giannoulas, claiming copyright and trademark infringement and further claiming that such performances would confuse children. In his case, Giannoulas cited that the purple dino was a "symbol of what is wrong with our society--a homage, if you will, to all the inane, banal platitudes that we readily accept and thrust unthinkingly upon our children", that his qualities are "insipid and corny", and that he also explains that, in an article posted in a 1997 issue of The New Yorker, he argues that at least some perceive Barney as a "pot-bellied," "sloppily fat" dinosaur who "giggle[s] compulsively in a tone of unequaled feeble-mindedness" and "jiggles his lumpish body like an overripe eggplant."  This court agreed with Giannoulas, and ruled against Lyons on July 29, 1998, declaring the sketches to be a parody that did not infringe on the rights of the character that Lyons created. "Barney the Dinosaur v. the Famous San Diego Chicken".

Lyons appealed this ruling to the Fifth Circuit Court of Appeals, but again lost their case to Giannoulas on July 7, 1999.

Barney vs. EFF
The Electronic Frontier Foundation hosted online archives from the Computer Underground Digest that contained Barney parody material. In 2001, Gibney, Anthony & Flaherty, LLP, lawyers for Lyons Partnership, issued a threat letter to
EFF claiming infringement of the Barney character. EFF strongly defended itself against these claims citing the established defence of parody, backed by United States First Amendment protections.

, the EFF successfully defended an anti-Barney website from a lawsuit. An article in British publication The Register applauded the victory.

Barney vs. CyberCheeze
Around 2001, Olympia, Washington-based comedy website CyberCheeze posted a work entitled "150 Ways to Kill the Purple Dinosaur". Lyons threatened legal action in response, and CyberCheeze replied on their site that the threat was "about as intellectual as the purple quivering mass of gyrating goo you call Barney, but that it also is demeaning to everyone that visits our website and reads this worthless attempt and scare tactic."Wired News: "Lawyers: Keep Barney Pure", includes reference to the EFF situation.

 Documentary
A miniseries about the hatred of Barney called I Love You, You Hate Me was released on Peacock on October 12, 2022. A trailer was released on September 28, 2022 

See also
Mr Blobby, an often-derided British character from the same time frame
Martin Pistorius, a child with locked-in syndrome who could not move or communicate for 12 years. He partially credits his antagonistic thoughts towards Barney'' (which were played as re-runs where he was staying) as helping him recover from his vegetative state.
Adam Sandler (costume wearer), nicknamed “Evil Elmo”

References

Humour
Barney & Friends
Parodies of television shows
Television controversies in the United States